Modern may refer to:

History
Modern history
 Early Modern period
 Late Modern period
 18th century
 19th century
 20th century
 Contemporary history
 Moderns, a faction of Freemasonry that existed in the 18th century

Philosophy and sociology
 Modernity, a loosely defined concept delineating a number of societal, economic and ideological features that contrast with "pre-modern" times or societies
 Late modernity

Art
 Modernism
 Modernist poetry
 Modern art, a form of art
 Modern dance, a dance form developed in the early 20th century
 Modern architecture, a broad movement and period in architectural history
 Modern music (disambiguation)

Geography
Modra, a Slovak city, referred to in the German language as "Modern"

Typography
 Modern (typeface), a raster font packaged with Windows XP
 Another name for the typeface classification known as Didone (typography)
 Modern, a generic font family name for fixed-pitch serif and sans serif fonts (for example, Courier and Pica), used e.g. in OpenDocument format or Rich Text Format

Music
 Modern (Buzzcocks  album)
Modern (EP), an EP by Gas
 Modern Records, a Los Angeles record label
 Modern (Amber Smith album)

Other uses
 Modernform Group, traded as MODERN, a furniture manufacturer and distributor in Thailand
 Modern Defense, a chess opening
 Modern (political party), Polish political party

See also
 Contemporary (disambiguation)
 Early modern human
 Modern age (disambiguation)
 Modern agriculture (disambiguation)
 Modern English
 Modern liberalism in the United States
 Modern Man (disambiguation)
 Modern paganism
 Modern philosophy
 Modern republicanism
 Modern Times (disambiguation)
 Postmodernism
 The Modern (disambiguation)